Kokubun-ji (国分寺) is a Buddhist temple in Kita-ku, Osaka, Osaka Prefecture, Japan. It was founded in 655 during the reign of Empress Kōgyoku, and is affiliated with Shingon Buddhism. It is also known as Nagara Kokubun-ji (長柄国分寺).

See also 
Thirteen Buddhist Sites of Osaka

External link 
 

Kita-ku, Osaka
Buddhist temples in Osaka
7th-century Buddhist temples
7th-century establishments in Japan